Cacatua is a genus of cockatoos found from the Philippines and Wallacea east to the Solomon Islands and south to Australia. They have a primarily white plumage (in some species tinged pinkish or yellow), an expressive crest, and a black (subgenus Cacatua) or pale (subgenus Licmetis) bill. Today, several species from this genus are considered threatened due to a combination of habitat loss and capture for the wild bird trade, with the blue-eyed cockatoo, Moluccan cockatoo, and umbrella cockatoo considered vulnerable, and the red-vented cockatoo and yellow-crested cockatoo considered critically endangered.

Taxonomy
Although the name Cacatua was used in 1760 by the French zoologist Mathurin Jacques Brisson he did not include it in his table of genera and Brisson is not recognised as the authority by the International Commission on Zoological Nomenclature (ICZN). The genus Kakatoe was introduced by Georges Cuvier in 1801 but this name has been suppressed by the ICZN and instead Louis Jean Pierre Vieillot is recognised as introducing the genus Cacatua in 1817. The type species was designated as the white cockatoo by Tommaso Salvadori in 1891. The name Cacatua is from the Malay language words Kakatuá and Kakak-tuá for the cockatoos.

Species
The genus contains 11 species.

References

 Juniper, T., & M. Parr (1998). A Guide to the Parrots of the World. Pica Press, East Sussex. 

 
Cacatuini
Bird genera
Taxa named by Louis Jean Pierre Vieillot